Major vault protein is a protein that in humans is encoded by the MVP gene. 78 copies of the protein assemble into the large compartments called vaults.

Function 

This gene encodes the major vault protein which is a lung infection resistance-related protein. Vaults are multi-subunit structures that may be involved in nucleo-cytoplasmic transport. This protein mediates drug resistance, perhaps via a transport process. It is widely distributed in normal tissues, and overexpressed in multidrug-resistant cancer cells. The protein overexpression is a potentially useful marker of clinical drug resistance. This gene produces two transcripts by using two alternative exon 2 sequences; however, the open reading frames are the same in both transcripts.

Interactions 

Major vault protein has been shown to interact with Estrogen receptor alpha, PTEN and PARP4.

References

Further reading 

 
 
 
 
 
 
 
 
 
 
 
 
 
 
 
 
 
 

Human proteins